Roger Bowling may refer to:
 Roger Bowling (songwriter)
 Roger Bowling (fighter)